Església de Sant Miquel de la Mosquera  is a church located in Encamp, Andorra. It is a heritage property registered in the Cultural Heritage of Andorra. It was built in the 16th century and renovated in the 18th century.

References

Encamp
Roman Catholic churches in Andorra
Cultural Heritage of Andorra